Keene-Flint Hall (formerly known as Science Hall and Flint Hall) is a historic site in Gainesville, Florida, United States. It is located in the northeastern section of the University of Florida. On June 27, 1979, it was added to the U.S. National Register of Historic Places. Keene-Flint Hall houses the University of Florida's History Department.

Namesake

Keene-Flint Hall is named for Dr. Edward R. Flint, the University of Florida's professor of chemistry from 1905 to 1919, and Kenneth Keene.

See also
University of Florida
Buildings at the University of Florida
Campus Historic District

References

External links
 Facility Information and History
 Alachua County listings at National Register of Historic Places
 Alachua County listings at Florida's Office of Cultural and Historical Programs
 Virtual tour of University of Florida Campus Historic District at Alachua County's Department of Growth Management
 The University of Florida Historic Campus at UF Facilities Planning & Construction
 George A. Smathers Libraries
 UF Builds: The Architecture of the University of Florida
 Flint Hall

National Register of Historic Places in Gainesville, Florida
Buildings at the University of Florida
William Augustus Edwards buildings
University and college buildings on the National Register of Historic Places in Florida